The Épinal International Piano Competition is a biannual piano competition held in Épinal, France. Founded in 1970, it is a member of the WFIMC since 1979.

Winners

References

External links
 

Piano competitions
Épinal
Music competitions in France